Martina Valcepina (born 4 June 1992) is an Italian short-track speed-skater. Her sister Arianna is also a short-track speed skater.

Career
Valcepina competed at the 2010 Winter Olympics for Italy. She placed fourth in her round one race of the 500 metres, failing to advance, finishing 31st overall. She was also a member of the Italian 3000 metre relay team, which finished fourth in the semi-finals and third in the B Final, ending up sixth overall.

As of 2013, Valcepina's best performance at the World Championships came in 2012, finishing 4th in the 500 metres. She also won a bronze medal at the 2010 World Short Track Speed Skating Team Championships for Italy, and two gold medals at the World Junior Championships.

As of 2013, Valcepina has one ISU Short Track Speed Skating World Cup victory, as part of the Italian relay team in 2011–12 at Nagoya. She also has eighteen other podium finishes as a member of the relay team. She finished second in the World Cup rankings in the 500 metres in 2011–12.

World Cup Podiums

References

External links

1992 births
Living people
Italian female short track speed skaters
Olympic short track speed skaters of Italy
Olympic silver medalists for Italy
Olympic bronze medalists for Italy
Olympic medalists in short track speed skating
Short track speed skaters at the 2010 Winter Olympics
Short track speed skaters at the 2014 Winter Olympics
Short track speed skaters at the 2018 Winter Olympics
Short track speed skaters at the 2022 Winter Olympics
Medalists at the 2014 Winter Olympics
Medalists at the 2018 Winter Olympics
Medalists at the 2022 Winter Olympics
People from Sondalo
World Short Track Speed Skating Championships medalists
Sportspeople from the Province of Sondrio